In Between, also known as Conjugal Affairs and The New Age of Living Together, is a 1994 romantic anthology film. It consists of three stories, by three directors from Hong Kong and Taiwan. The three segments are, in the following order:
 Star Hunter, written and directed by Samson Chiu.
 Lonely Hearts Club, written and directed by Yonfan.
 Unwed Mother, written and directed by Sylvia Chang.

Plot
The film follows three roommates as they go through trials and tribulations in their respective love lives.
Star Hunter - A womanizing hairstylist develops a romantic friendship with a mysterious woman.
Lonely Hearts Club - A young stockbroker who's feeling more and more distant from his long-term girlfriend begins an affair with an older woman about to get divorced.
Unwed Mother - A woman who discovers she's pregnant is unsure whether the father is her long-term on-and-off boyfriend or the Russian man she had a one-night stand with.

Cast

Star Hunter
 Jan Lamb as Eddie
 Wu Chien-lien as Icy

Lonely Hearts Club
 Nicky Wu as Steven Chan
 Sylvia Chang as Anna Lau
 Melvin Wong as Joseph Lau
 Lee Ching as Amy
 Emotion Cheung as Steven's co-worker

Unwed Mother
 Maggie Cheung as Co Co Lau
 Winston Chao as Wong Man Fai
 Eric Kot as Keung

External links

  In Between at the Hong Kong Film Archive
 The New Age of Living Together at the Hong Kong Movie DataBase

1994 films
1994 comedy-drama films
1990s romance films
Taiwanese anthology films
Chinese-language films
Films directed by Yonfan
Hong Kong romantic comedy-drama films
1990s Mandarin-language films
Taiwanese romantic comedy-drama films
Films directed by Sylvia Chang
Films directed by Samson Chiu
1990s Hong Kong films